Kapotaksha Express (Tr 715/716) is a Bangladeshi Intercity train service runs between the two western cities of Bangladesh Khulna and Rajshahi.

History
The first inaugural run of Kapotaksha Express was on 1 May 1986. In 1988 the service was temporarily stopped. In late 1989 the service started again from Khulna to Rajshahi. Initially this train halted only in Jessore, Chuadanga and Ishwardi. Now it has 15 stoppages in between the routes.

This train was named after the river Kapotaksha.

Schedule
This train departs Khulna at 6:15am and reaches Rajshahi at 12:20pm. The returning journey starts at 2:10pm by departing Rajshahi. This train reaches Jessore, Jhenaidah, Chuadanga, Kushtia, Pabna and Natore district. Its weekly off day is Sunday.

Facilities
The rake of Kapotaksha Express consists of 11 LHB COACHES. It has one AC chair car and eight8 non-AC chair cars with two power cars. It usually gets Class 6500 locomotives.

Stoppages

See also
 Sagardari Express
 Chitra Express
 Sundarban Express

References

Named passenger trains of Bangladesh
Transport in Khulna